Osgoode Hall, building in Toronto, Canada
Osgoode Hall Law School
Osgoode Station, rapid transit station in Toronto
Osgoode, Ontario
Osgoode Township, Ontario, ward in Ottawa
William Osgoode, first Chief Justice of Upper Canada

See also
Osgood (disambiguation)